The Nagpur–Rewa Superfast Express is a Superfast train belonging to Central Railway zone that runs between  and  in India. It is currently being operated with 22135/22136 train numbers on a weekly basis.

Service

The 22135/Nagpur–Rewa SF Express has an average speed of 63 km/hr and covers 782 km in 12h 30m. The 22136/Rewa–Nagpur SF Express has an average speed of 56 km/hr and covers 782 km in 14h 5m.

Route and halts 

The important halts of the train are:

Coach composition

The train has standard LHB rakes with max speed of 110 kmph. The train consists of 16 coaches:

 1 AC II Tier and AC III Tier
 1 AC III Tier
 6 Sleeper coaches
 6 General Unreserved
 2 Seating cum Luggage Rake

Traction

Both trains are hauled by a Kalyan Loco Shed-based WDM-3A diesel locomotive from Nagpur to Rewa and vice versa.

Rake sharing

The train shares its rake with 11201/11202 Lokmanya Tilak Terminus–Ajni Express and 11205/11206 Lokmanya Tilak Terminus–Nizamabad Express.

See also 

 Rewa Terminal railway station
 Nagpur Junction railway station
 Lokmanya Tilak Terminus–Ajni Express
 Lokmanya Tilak Terminus–Nizamabad Express

Notes

References

External links 

 22135/Nagpur - Rewa SF Express India Rail Info
 22136/Rewa - Nagpur SF Express India Rail Info

Transport in Nagpur
Transport in Rewa, Madhya Pradesh
Express trains in India
Rail transport in Maharashtra
Rail transport in Madhya Pradesh
Railway services introduced in 2015